"Dozing Green" (stylized DOZING GREEN) is a single by Dir En Grey,  released on October 24, 2007 in Japan and across Europe as well as in the iTunes Store until the end of October. The Japanese edition includes two b-sides, "Hydra -666-" and "Agitated Screams of Maggots [Live]". The European release features only "Dozing Green" and "Agitated Screams of Maggots", while the iTunes release is sold as the title track only.

The music video for "Dozing Green" shows cells from The Drifting Classroom by horror manga artist Kazuo Umezu. The music video of "Hydra -666-" can be found on In Weal or Woe.

"Dozing Green" is one of the two singles featured on Uroboros, along with "Glass Skin". Like its counterpart, the song is re-recorded in English for the album.

The music video for "Dozing Green" was voted the #1 video of the year 2008 on the MTV2 show Headbangers Ball.

Music
For "Dozing Green", guitarist Kaoru performed on a PRS Custom 24, while Die recorded on a Fender Stratocaster in the studio. The music video however, shows Kaoru performing on the usual ESP Viper and Die on an ESP Eclipse.

The first b-side, "Hydra -666-", is a rearrangement of the song "Hydra" originally recorded for Macabre (2000). The "Agitated Screams of Maggots" live recording was performed at a concert limited to registered purchasers of the band's previous album, The Marrow of a Bone (2007).

Track listing

European version

Personnel
 Dir En Grey – producer
 Kyo – vocals
 Kaoru – guitar
 Die – guitar
 Toshiya – bass guitar
 Shinya – drums
 Yasushi "Koni-Young" Konishi – recording, mixing
 Miles Showell – mastering
 Dynamite Tommy – executive producer
 Takato Yamamoto – cover art
 Kazuya Nakajima, Taka Hashinoto – live recording
 Yoshinori Abe & Kaoru - Programming

References

2007 singles
Dir En Grey songs
Songs written by Kyo (musician)
2007 songs